Three ships in the United States Navy have been named USS Patterson for Daniel Patterson.

 The first  was a  launched in 1910 and served in World War I. She served in the United States Coast Guard from 1924 to 1930. She was sold in 1934.
 The second  was a  launched in 1937, served in World War II and decommissioned in 1945.
 The third  was a  launched in 1969 and decommissioned in 1991.

There was possibly a USS Patterson before 1910. An 8 February 1898 Evening Star, Washington, DC, newspaper article stated that US Navy Lieutenant Commander Charles T. Forse took command of Patterson from Lieutenant Commander E. K. Moore, who had commanded Patterson for the previous three years. Patterson was detailed, along with Gedney, to survey the mouth of the Yukon River in the Territory of Alaska.

References

United States Navy ship names